is a Japanese politician who served as the Minister of the Environment from September 2019 to October 2021.  He also serves as a member the Member of the House of Representatives for the Liberal Democratic Party. He is the second son of former Prime Minister Junichirō Koizumi and the younger brother of actor Kotaro Koizumi.

After graduating from university, Koizumi worked as a researcher at the Washington-based think tank Center for Strategic and International Studies, and became active politically as Young Leader of the Pacific Forum CSIS. He also spent time working as a political secretary for his father in the final years of his second term as Prime Minister. In the 2009 election, he was elected to the House of Representatives for the seat his father had occupied for more than 35 years.

After the election of the Abe Government in 2012, Koizumi was appointed as a Vice-Minister for Reconstruction, focusing on the northeastern region of Japan that was devastated by the March 2011 tsunami and subsequent nuclear disaster. He publicly opposed his father's calls for Japan to abandon nuclear energy immediately. In 2019, Prime Minister Shinzo Abe appointed Koizumi to the Cabinet as Minister of the Environment, a role he retained when Yoshihide Suga succeeded Abe as Prime Minister in September 2020. In January 2020, Koizumi received international news attention when he announced his plans to take two weeks of paternity leave when his first child was born.

Early life
Koizumi grew up in Yokosuka, his father's home district, attending Kanto Gakuin University in Yokohama from elementary school through university with a Bachelor of Economics degree in 2004. When he was a student in junior high and senior high schools, he was engrossed in playing sports, especially baseball. He received his master's degree in political science from Columbia University. He spent one year as a part-time research fellow at the Center for Strategic and International Studies and as Young Leader of the Pacific Forum CSIS before returning to Japan in 2007. After that, he worked as a private secretary of Junichirō, his father.

Political career
Following his father's announced retirement in 2008, he was elected to his father's former seat representing the Kanagawa 11th district in the August 2009 general election, in which many other LDP seats were lost to the Democratic Party of Japan. He faced criticism for being a hereditary politician. He campaigned in a rented Toyota Prius with a volunteer staff.

Koizumi became head of the LDP's young legislators caucus in October 2011, a post previously held by Prime Ministers Takeshita, Uno, Kaifu, Abe and Asō. In February 2012, he started a project called "Team 11," which sent members of the division to areas of the Tōhoku region affected by the 2011 Tōhoku earthquake and tsunami on the 11th of each month to talk to locals and report back on the state of the reconstruction efforts. The group had 82 members, all under the age of 45, as of March 2013. Some observers compared the group to the powerful "Machimura faction" led by Nobutaka Machimura in terms of its political weight.

He was critical of the LDP under party president Sadakazu Tanigaki. In his first meeting as a party officer, he stated that "the image of the party is that it doesn't listen to the opinions of young people, has old thoughts and a hard head. That is why trust will not be restored." He argued in a November 2011 speech that the party's stance on the controversial Trans-Pacific Partnership trade agreement needed to be clarified. He later advocated breaking up the LDP's agreement with the Democratic Party of Japan and Komeito to pass an overhaul of the social security and tax system, directly arguing to Tanigaki that the party's mission should be to take down the DPJ government and to restore LDP control, and drawing comparisons to his father's maverick reputation.

Koizumi broke ranks with the LDP in August 2012 as one of seven LDP legislators who refused to walk out of the no-confidence vote instigated by Ichiro Ozawa against Prime Minister Yoshihiko Noda, in which the LDP and NK had agreed to throw out their votes. Although Koizumi voted for the no-confidence resolution, it was ultimately voted down 246–86. He voted for Shigeru Ishiba against Shinzō Abe in the LDP leadership election of September 2012, but did not make his vote public until after the election in order to avoid influencing others' votes.

Koizumi was re-elected in the December 2012 general election, which restored LDP control of the government under Abe. In the subsequent House of Councillors election in July 2013, he focused his campaigning efforts on disaster zones, outlying islands and areas in rapid population decline, giving speeches in support of their local LDP candidates. Kenichi Tokoi, a nonfiction author who wrote a book about Koizumi, said that his goal was to shake as many individual hands as possible and to leave the impression that he was kind enough to visit them, something which he could not achieve by campaigning in big cities.

In October 2013, he was appointed Parliamentary Secretary in charge of Tohoku Recovery, in which capacity he would oversee post-disaster reconstruction efforts in Iwate Prefecture and Miyagi Prefecture. Ishiba, then secretary general of the LDP, stated that Koizumi "made a very strong case" with local disaster victims "about what he wanted to do and why." Tokoi characterized this posting as a test of Koizumi's administrative ability.

Koizumi was reportedly considered for a formal cabinet post under the Abe government in the reshuffles of October 2015 and July 2017. On 11 September 2019, Abe appointed Koizumi as Minister of the Environment. He advocated for environmentalist policies, including ending Japan's use of nuclear and coal power, despite serving in a government considered skeptical of such policies.

However, he supports the construction of new coal-fired power stations in Japan, despite their particulate and greenhouse gas emissions. His support for the construction of two coal-fired power stations in Yokosuka has led him to be a "a target of activists' wrath".

In late August 2020, after the resignation of Shinzo Abe, Koizumi was named as a possible successor. A Kyodo News survey showed that almost 9% of those surveyed preferred him for prime minister, though some inside the party consider him too young to be in charge of the country. He later formally withdrew his candidacy and endorsed Minister of Defense Tarō Kōno. In the party's leadership election of 2021 (which ended with Fumio Kishida being elected as leader and later prime minister), Koizumi again endorsed Kōno for the position.

Views

Like his father, Koizumi visits Yasukuni Shrine on 15 August, the anniversary of Japan's surrender in World War II. He visited in 2012 and again in 2013.

In a May 2013 interview with the Sankei Shimbun, he refused to comment on Osaka mayor Toru Hashimoto's controversial remarks on comfort women, characterizing the issue as one that should be discussed among experts and historians rather than politicians. He described the perceived nationalist shift in Japanese politics as "Chinese propaganda" and stated that the government needed to wage a better public relations campaign against it while focusing on the successful implementation of Abenomics. He also commented on the Japanese Constitution, stating that amendments were necessary but that there were more immediate problems to be solved: "I go to the disaster zones in Tohoku every month, and the constitution has not come up even once as an issue when I walk down the street there."

Koizumi was critical of the Abe government's decision to terminate a corporate tax surcharge intended to fund the Tohoku recovery, and views nuclear power as unsustainable in the long term, mirroring views that his father expressed in 2013.

Popularity

Koizumi had a 75.6% approval rating at the start of his stint as parliamentary secretary for Tohoku recovery. In a December 2013 TBS poll, he ranked second after Shinzo Abe as the most favoured candidate for prime minister, although 57% responded that they had no particular favoured candidate. In April 2017, in the aftermath of the Moritomo Gakuen scandal surrounding Prime Minister Abe, polls by Yomiuri and NTV showed Koizumi as the most favoured LDP leader (and presumptive Prime Minister), surpassing both Abe and challenger Shigeru Ishiba.

Following the December 2012 election, the National Diet Building gift shop began selling "Shinji-Rolls" (進次ろうる), souvenir green tea-flavoured roll cakes branded with Koizumi's likeness. Shinji-Rolls became the gift shop's second most popular item in 2013, outselling souvenirs branded with the likenesses of LDP leaders Shigeru Ishiba and Taro Aso, and outsold only by manju bearing the likeness of Shinzo Abe.

Personal life
On 7 August 2019, television announcer and news presenter Christel Takigawa announced that she married Shinjiro Koizumi. She gave birth to a son on 17 January 2020.

Ancestry

See also
 Koizumi family

References

External links 
  

1981 births
Living people
People from Yokosuka, Kanagawa
Shinjiro
Columbia Graduate School of Arts and Sciences alumni
Members of the House of Representatives (Japan)
Liberal Democratic Party (Japan) politicians
Children of prime ministers of Japan
Kanto Gakuin University alumni
Environment ministers of Japan
21st-century Japanese politicians
Politicians from Kanagawa Prefecture